Igor Taševski (Serbian Cyrillic: Игop Taшeвcки; born 27 July 1972) is a Serbian retired footballer who played mainly as a central defender.

Football career
Born in Belgrade, Socialist Federal Republic of Yugoslavia, Taševski started his professional career with hometown's FK Rad, and signed with country giants FK Partizan in 1994, helping the capital club to back-to-back league titles.

Subsequently, he spent seven years in Spain, mostly in its second division, helping Villarreal CF return to La Liga after just one year while contributing with 35 games (33 starts). After spells with Elche CF and Sporting de Gijón, Taševski retired in 2006 with lowly FK Voždovac.

Honours
Partizan
First League of Serbia and Montenegro: 1995–96, 1996–97
Serbia and Montenegro Cup: 1997–98

References

External links

1972 births
Living people
Footballers from Belgrade
Yugoslav footballers
Serbian footballers
Association football defenders
Yugoslav First League players
FK Rad players
FK Partizan players
FK Voždovac players
La Liga players
Segunda División players
Villarreal CF players
Elche CF players
Sporting de Gijón players
Serbian expatriate footballers
Expatriate footballers in Spain
Serbian expatriate sportspeople in Spain